The 2016–17 network television schedule for the five major English-language commercial broadcast networks in the United States covers prime time hours from September 2016 to August 2017. The schedule is followed by a list per network of returning series, new series, and series canceled after the 2015–16 season.

NBC was the first to announce its fall schedule, on May 15, 2016, followed by Fox on May 16, ABC on May 17, CBS on May 18 and The CW on May 19, 2016.

PBS is not included; member television stations have local flexibility over most of their schedules and broadcast times for network shows may vary. Ion Television and MyNetworkTV are also not included since the majority of both networks' schedules comprise syndicated reruns (with limited original programming on the former). The CW is not included on weekends since it does not carry network programming on those days.

New series are highlighted in bold.
All times are U.S. Eastern and Pacific time (except for some live sports or events). Subtract one hour for Central and Mountain times.

Each of the 30 highest-rated shows is listed with its rank and rating as determined by Nielsen Media Research.

Legend

Sunday

Monday

Tuesday

Note: ABC aired Dancing with the Stars on Tuesday from September 20 to October 4.

Wednesday

Thursday

Note: On both CBS and NBC, Thursday Night Kickoff/Football Night in... started at 7:30 p.m. ET out of primetime depending on the network carrying the game, pre-empting local programming. NBC's scheduling for the NFL's Kickoff Game and Thanksgiving night game was under the different Sunday Night Football package and game coverage filled the entirety of primetime.

Friday

Saturday

Note: NBC carried primetime coverage of Notre Dame college football and NASCAR some Saturday evenings through the fall, along with one January NFL Wild Card game, while CBS carried one January primetime NFL divisional playoff game and one November primetime SEC college football game.
Note: NBC carried primetime coverage of some NHL games between February and June (including a regular-season Stadium Series game and some games in the Stanley Cup playoffs).
Note: NBC's Pacific and Mountain Time Zone affiliates, beginning April 15, 2017, carried Saturday Night Live in real time with the rest of the United States, placing its airtime within the prime time period; a re-air was broadcast after the late local news in those time zones. The network's affiliates in Alaska, Hawaii and other Pacific islands carried the show on delay as usual.

By network

ABC

Returning series:
20/20
20/20: In an Instant
The $100,000 Pyramid
ABC Saturday Movie of the Week
Agents of S.H.I.E.L.D.
America's Funniest Home Videos 
American Crime
The Bachelor
Bachelor in Paradise
Battle of the Network Stars
Black-ish 
The Catch
Celebrity Family Feud
Dancing with the Stars
Dr. Ken
Fresh Off the Boat
The Goldbergs
The Gong Show
The Great American Baking Show
The Great Christmas Light Fight 
Grey's Anatomy
How to Get Away with Murder
Last Man Standing
Match Game
The Middle
Modern Family
NBA Saturday Primetime
Once Upon a Time
Quantico
The Real O'Neals
Saturday Night Football
Scandal
Secrets and Lies
Shark Tank
To Tell the Truth
What Would You Do?

New series:
American Housewife
Big Fan *
Boy Band *
Conviction
Designated Survivor
Downward Dog *
Imaginary Mary *
Notorious
Somewhere Between *
Speechless
Steve Harvey's Funderdome *
Still Star-Crossed *
Time After Time *
The Toy Box *
When We Rise *

Not returning from 2015–16: 
500 Questions
Agent Carter
Beyond the Tank
Blood & Oil
Boston EMS
Castle
The Family
Galavant
Mistresses
The Muppets
Nashville (moved to CMT)
Of Kings and Prophets
Uncle Buck
Wicked City

CBS

Returning series: 
2 Broke Girls
48 Hours
60 Minutes
The Amazing Race
The Big Bang Theory
Big Brother
Blue Bloods
Code Black
Criminal Minds
Criminal Minds: Beyond Borders
Elementary
Hawaii Five-0
Life in Pieces
Madam Secretary
Mom
NCIS 
NCIS: Los Angeles
NCIS: New Orleans
The Odd Couple
Scorpion
Survivor
Thursday Night Football (split with NBC)
Undercover Boss
Zoo

New series:
48 Hours: NCIS *
Bull 
Candy Crush *
CBSN: On Assignment *
Doubt *
The Good Fight *
The Great Indoors
Hunted *
Kevin Can Wait
MacGyver
Man with a Plan
Pure Genius
Ransom *
Salvation *
Superior Donuts *
Training Day *

Not returning from 2015–16:
American Gothic
Angel from Hell
BrainDead
CSI: Crime Scene Investigation
CSI: Cyber
The Good Wife
Limitless
Mike & Molly
Person of Interest 
Rush Hour
Supergirl (moved to The CW)

The CW

Returning series:
 The 100
 Arrow
 Crazy Ex-Girlfriend
 The Flash
 iZombie
 Jane the Virgin
 Legends of Tomorrow
 Masters of Illusion
 The Originals
 Penn & Teller: Fool Us
 Reign
 Supergirl (moved from CBS)
 Supernatural
 The Vampire Diaries
 Whose Line Is It Anyway?

New series:
Frequency
Hooten & the Lady *
No Tomorrow
Riverdale *

Not returning from 2015–16:
America's Next Top Model (moved to VH1)
Beauty & the Beast
Containment
MADtv

Fox

Returning series:
American Grit
Bob's Burgers
Bones
Brooklyn Nine-Nine
Empire
Family Guy
Fox College Football
Gotham
Hell's Kitchen
The Last Man on Earth
Lucifer 
MasterChef Junior
New Girl
NFL on Fox
Prison Break
Rosewood
Scream Queens
So You Think You Can Dance
Sleepy Hollow
The Simpsons

New series:
24: Legacy *
APB *
Beat Shazam *
The Exorcist
The F Word *
Kicking & Screaming *
Lethal Weapon
Making History *
The Mick *
My Kitchen Rules *
Pitch
Shots Fired *
Son of Zorn
Star *
You the Jury *

Not returning from 2015–16:
American Idol (revived by ABC in 2017–18)
Bordertown
Cooper Barrett's Guide to Surviving Life
Coupled
Grandfathered
The Grinder
Houdini & Doyle
Minority Report
Second Chance
Wayward Pines

NBC

Returning series:
American Ninja Warrior
America's Got Talent
The Apprentice
The Blacklist
Blindspot
The Carmichael Show
Caught on Camera with Nick Cannon
Chicago Fire
Chicago Med
Chicago P.D.
Dateline NBC
Football Night in America 
Grimm
Hollywood Game Night
Law & Order: Special Victims Unit
Little Big Shots
NBC Sunday Night Football
The Night Shift
Saturday Night Live Weekend Update Thursday
Shades of Blue
Spartan: Ultimate Team Challenge
Superstore
Thursday Night Football (split with CBS)
The Voice

New series:
The Blacklist: Redemption *
Chicago Justice *
Emerald City *
First Dates *
The Good Place
Great News *
Little Big Shots: Forever Young *
Marlon *
Midnight, Texas *
Powerless *
Sunday Night with Megyn Kelly *
Taken *
This Is Us
Timeless
Trial & Error *
The Wall
World of Dance *

Not returning from 2015–16:
Aquarius
Best Time Ever with Neil Patrick Harris
Crowded
Game of Silence
Heartbeat
Heroes Reborn
Maya & Marty
The Mysteries of Laura
The Player
Telenovela
Truth Be Told
Undateable
You, Me and the Apocalypse

Renewals and cancellations

Full season pickups

ABC
American Housewife—Picked up for a 22-episode full season on November 4, 2016, an additional episode was ordered on December 13, 2016, totaling to 23 episodes.
Designated Survivor—Picked up for a 22-episode full season on September 29, 2016.
The Real O'Neals—Picked up for an additional three episodes on November 4, 2016, bringing the episode count up to 16.
Speechless—Picked up for a 22-episode full season on September 29, 2016, an additional episode was ordered on December 13, 2016, totaling to 23 episodes.

CBS
Bull—Picked up for a 22-episode full season on October 17, 2016.
Code Black—Picked up for an additional three episodes on November 14, 2016, bringing the episode count up to 16.
The Great Indoors—Picked up for a 19-episode full season on November 14, 2016, three additional episodes were ordered on January 6, 2017, totaling to 22 episodes. 
Kevin Can Wait—Picked up for a 22-episode full season on October 17, 2016, two additional episodes were ordered on January 6, 2017, bringing the episode count up to 24. 
MacGyver—Picked up for a 22-episode full season on October 17, 2016.
Man with a Plan—Picked up for a 19-episode full season on November 14, 2016; three additional episodes were ordered on January 6, 2017, totaling to 22 episodes.

The CW
Legends of Tomorrow—Picked up for an additional four episodes on November 9, 2016, bringing the episode count up to 17.

Fox
Lethal Weapon—Picked up for an 18-episode full season on October 12, 2016.
Lucifer—Picked up for a 22-episode full season on October 31, 2016.
The Mick—Picked up for a 17-episode full season on January 11, 2017.

NBC
Superstore—Picked up for a 22-episode full season on September 23, 2016.
This Is Us—Picked up for an 18-episode full season on September 27, 2016.
Timeless—Picked up for a 16-episode full season on November 1, 2016.

Renewals

ABC
The $100,000 Pyramid—Renewed for a third season on August 6, 2017.
Agents of S.H.I.E.L.D.—Renewed for a fifth season on May 11, 2017.
America's Funniest Home Videos—Renewed for a twenty-eighth season on May 12, 2017.
American Housewife—Renewed for a second season on May 11, 2017.
The Bachelor—Renewed for a twenty-second season on May 11, 2017.
Black-ish—Renewed for a fourth season on May 10, 2017.
Celebrity Family Feud—Renewed for a fifth  season on August 6, 2017.
Dancing with the Stars—Renewed for a twenty-fifth season on May 11, 2017.
Designated Survivor—Renewed for a second season on May 11, 2017.
Fresh Off the Boat—Renewed for a fourth season on May 12, 2017.
The Goldbergs—Renewed for a fifth and sixth season on May 11, 2017.
The Gong Show—Renewed for a second season on January 8, 2018.
Grey's Anatomy—Renewed for a fourteenth season on February 10, 2017.
How to Get Away with Murder—Renewed for a fourth season on February 10, 2017.
Match Game—Renewed for a third season on August 6, 2017.
The Middle—Renewed for a ninth and final season on January 25, 2017. 
Modern Family—Renewed for a ninth and tenth season on May 10, 2017
Once Upon a Time—Renewed for a seventh and final season on May 11, 2017. 
Quantico—Renewed for a third season on May 15, 2017.
Scandal—Renewed for a seventh and final season on February 10, 2017. 
Shark Tank—Renewed for a ninth season on May 11, 2017.
Speechless—Renewed for a second season on May 12, 2017.
The Toy Box—Renewed for a second season on June 16, 2017.

CBS
48 Hours—Renewed for a thirtieth season on March 23, 2017.
60 Minutes—Renewed for a fiftieth season on March 23, 2017.
The Amazing Race—Renewed for a thirtieth season on May 13, 2017.
The Big Bang Theory—Renewed for an eleventh and twelfth season on March 20, 2017.
Big Brother—Renewed for a twentieth season on August 10, 2016.
Blue Bloods—Renewed for an eighth season on March 23, 2017.
Bull—Renewed for a second season on March 23, 2017.
Code Black—Renewed for a third season on May 14, 2017.
Criminal Minds—Renewed for a thirteenth season on April 7, 2017.
Elementary—Renewed for a sixth season on May 13, 2017.
Hawaii Five-0—Renewed for an eighth season on March 23, 2017.
Kevin Can Wait—Renewed for a second season on March 23, 2017.
Life in Pieces—Renewed for a third season on March 23, 2017.
MacGyver—Renewed for a second season on March 23, 2017.
Madam Secretary—Renewed for a fourth season on March 23, 2017.
Man with a Plan—Renewed for a second season on March 23, 2017.
Mom—Renewed for a fifth season on March 23, 2017.
NCIS—Renewed for a fifteenth season on February 29, 2016.
NCIS: Los Angeles—Renewed for a ninth season on March 23, 2017.
NCIS: New Orleans—Renewed for a fourth season on March 23, 2017.
Ransom—Renewed for a second season on October 10, 2017.
Salvation—Renewed for a second season on October 18, 2017.
Scorpion—Renewed for a fourth season on March 23, 2017.
Superior Donuts—Renewed for a second season on March 23, 2017.
Survivor—Renewed for a thirty-fifth season on March 23, 2017.
Thursday Night Football—Renewed for a fourth season with CBS and second season with NBC, as part of a new split contract on February 1, 2016.
Undercover Boss—Renewed for a ninth season on May 17, 2017.

The CW
 The 100—Renewed for a fifth season on March 10, 2017.
 Arrow—Renewed for a sixth season on January 8, 2017.
 Crazy Ex-Girlfriend—Renewed for a third season on January 8, 2017.
 iZombie—Renewed for a fourth season on May 10, 2017.
 The Flash—Renewed for a fourth season on January 8, 2017.
 Jane the Virgin—Renewed for a fourth season on January 8, 2017.
 Legends of Tomorrow—Renewed for a third season on January 8, 2017.
 The Originals—Renewed for a fifth and final season on May 10, 2017.
 Riverdale—Renewed for a second season on March 7, 2017.
 Supergirl—Renewed for a third season on January 8, 2017.
 Supernatural—Renewed for a thirteenth season on January 8, 2017.

Fox
Beat Shazam—Renewed for a second season on July 12, 2017.
Bob's Burgers—Renewed for an eighth season on October 7, 2015.
Brooklyn Nine-Nine—Renewed for a fifth season on May 12, 2017.
Empire—Renewed for a fourth season on January 11, 2017.
The Exorcist—Renewed for a second season on May 12, 2017.
Family Guy—Renewed for a sixteenth season on May 15, 2017.
Gotham—Renewed for a fourth season on May 10, 2017.
Hell's Kitchen—Renewed for a seventeenth and eighteenth season on September 9, 2016.
The Last Man on Earth—Renewed for a fourth season on May 10, 2017.
Lethal Weapon—Renewed for a second season on February 22, 2017.
Love Connection—Renewed for a second season on August 10, 2017.
Lucifer—Renewed for a third season on February 13, 2017.
The Mick—Renewed for a second season on February 21, 2017.
New Girl—Renewed for a seventh and final season on May 14, 2017.
The Simpsons—Renewed for a twenty-ninth and thirtieth season on November 4, 2016.
So You Think You Can Dance—Renewed for fifteenth season on February 16, 2018.
Star—Renewed for a second season on February 22, 2017.

NBC
America's Got Talent—Renewed for a thirteenth season on February 21, 2018.
The Blacklist—Renewed for a fifth season on May 11, 2017.
Blindspot—Renewed for a third season on May 10, 2017.
Chicago Fire—Renewed for a sixth season on May 10, 2017.
Chicago Med—Renewed for a third season on May 10, 2017.
Chicago P.D.—Renewed for a fifth season on May 10, 2017.
Football Night in America—Renewed for a twelfth season on December 14, 2011.
The Good Place— Renewed for a second season on January 30, 2017.
Great News—Renewed for a second season on May 11, 2017.
Hollywood Game Night—Renewed for a sixth season on March 19, 2018.
Law & Order: Special Victims Unit—Renewed for a nineteenth season on May 12, 2017.
Little Big Shots—Renewed for a third season on May 14, 2017.
Marlon—Renewed for a second season on September 28, 2017.
Midnight, Texas—Renewed for a second season on February 14, 2018.
NBC Sunday Night Football—Renewed for a twelfth season on December 14, 2011.
Shades of Blue—Renewed for a third season on March 17, 2017.
Superstore—Renewed for a third season on February 14, 2017.
Taken—Renewed for a second season on May 9, 2017.
This Is Us—Renewed for a second and third season on January 18, 2017.
Thursday Night Football—Renewed for a fourth season with CBS and second season with NBC, as part of a new split contract on February 1, 2016.
Timeless—Renewed as a ten-episode spring/summer series on May 13, 2017, three days after initially being canceled.
Trial & Error—Renewed for a second season on May 20, 2017.
The Voice—Renewed for a thirteenth season on October 18, 2016.
The Wall—Renewed for a second and third season on May 14, 2017.
World of Dance—Renewed for a second season on June 29, 2017.

Cancellations/series endings

ABC
American Crime—Canceled on May 11, 2017, after three seasons.
The Catch—Canceled on May 11, 2017, after two seasons.
Conviction—Canceled on May 11, 2017.
Downward Dog—Canceled on June 23, 2017.
Dr. Ken—Canceled on May 11, 2017, after two seasons.
Imaginary Mary—Canceled on May 11, 2017. The series concluded on May 30, 2017.
Last Man Standing—Canceled on May 10, 2017, after six seasons. On May 11, 2018, it was announced that Fox would pick up the series for another season.
Notorious—Canceled on May 11, 2017.
The Real O'Neals—Canceled on May 11, 2017, after two seasons.
Secrets and Lies—Canceled on May 11, 2017, after two seasons.
Time After Time—Canceled on March 29, 2017, after five low rated episodes.

CBS
2 Broke Girls—Canceled on May 12, 2017, after six seasons.
Criminal Minds: Beyond Borders—Canceled on May 14, 2017, after two seasons.
Doubt—Canceled on February 24, 2017, after two low rated episodes. This was the first cancellation of the season.
The Great Indoors—Canceled on May 13, 2017.
The Odd Couple—Canceled on May 15, 2017, after three seasons.
Pure Genius—Canceled on May 16, 2017.
Training Day—Canceled on May 17, 2017. This decision was made after star Bill Paxton's untimely death in February. 
Zoo—Canceled on October 23, 2017, after three seasons.

The CW
Frequency—Canceled on May 8, 2017.
Hooten & the Lady— Canceled on August 2, 2017.
No Tomorrow—Canceled on May 8, 2017.
Reign—It was announced on December 7, 2016, that season four would be the final season. The series concluded on June 16, 2017.
The Vampire Diaries—It was announced on July 23, 2016, that season eight would be the final season. The series concluded on March 10, 2017.

Fox
24: Legacy—Canceled on June 7, 2017.
APB—Canceled on May 11, 2017.
Bones—It was announced on February 25, 2016, that season twelve would be the final season. The series concluded on March 28, 2017.
Making History—Canceled on May 11, 2017. The series concluded on May 21, 2017.
Pitch—Canceled on May 1, 2017.
Prison Break—The revival was meant to run for one season only; it concluded on May 30, 2017.
Rosewood—Canceled on May 9, 2017, after two seasons.
Scream Queens—Canceled on May 15, 2017, after two seasons.
Sleepy Hollow—Canceled on May 9, 2017, after four seasons.
Son of Zorn—Canceled on May 11, 2017.
You the Jury—Canceled on May 1, 2017, after two episodes.

NBC
The Apprentice—Canceled on August 3, 2017, after fifteen seasons.
The Blacklist: Redemption—Canceled on May 12, 2017.
The Carmichael Show—Canceled on June 30, 2017, after three seasons. The series concluded on August 9, 2017.
Chicago Justice—Canceled on May 22, 2017.
Emerald City—Canceled on May 4, 2017.
Grimm—It was announced on August 29, 2016, that season six would be the final season. The series concluded on March 31, 2017.
The Night Shift—Canceled on October 13, 2017, after four seasons.
Powerless—Pulled from the schedule on April 25, 2017, after nine episodes. It was later canceled on May 11, 2017.

See also
2016–17 Canadian network television schedule
2016–17 United States network television schedule (daytime)
2016–17 United States network television schedule (late night)

References

United States primetime network television schedules
2016 in American television
2017 in American television